Rymer Point is a cape in the Canadian Arctic territory of Nunavut. It is located on southwestern Victoria Island's Wollaston Peninsula, facing the Dolphin and Union Strait. Clouston Bay is situated along the north shoreline.  Nuvuk Point is on the southwest side, jutting into Simpson Bay.

Geography
The low cliffs of Rymer Point are characterized by carbonate rock.

History
Various trading posts operated at Rymer Point, including one by the Hudson's Bay Company, named Fort Harmon, and another by the Christian Klengenberg family.

References

Peninsulas of Kitikmeot Region
Headlands of Kitikmeot Region
Victoria Island (Canada)
Former populated places in the Kitikmeot Region